Key West is a 1973 American made-for-television drama thriller film directed by Philip Leacock and starring Stephen Boyd. It was the pilot for a TV series that did not eventuate but it still screened as a stand-alone movie.

Plot
Two friends operate a charter boat business in Key West.

Cast
 Stephen Boyd as Steve Cutler
 Woody Strode as Candy Rhodes
 Tiffany Bolling as Ruth Frazier
 Simon Oakland as General Tom Luker
 William Prince as Senator Scott
 Ford Rainey as Prescott Webb
 Don Collier as Chief Jim Miller
 Shug Fisher as Sam Olsen (as George 'Shug' Fisher)
 Sheree North as Brandi
 Earl Hindman as Rick
 Stephen Mendillo as George Lucey
 Virginia Kiser as Carol Luker
 Tony Giorgio as Joseph Canto
 Milton Selzer as Stauffer
 Dick Sabol as Bodie
 Courtney Brown as Ryder
 Buddy Owen as Elmo Gant 
 Earl Widener as Albert

See also
 List of American films of 1973

References

External links
Key West at IMDb
Key West at Stephen Boyd Fan Page
Key West at TCMDB
Key West at BFI

1973 television films
1973 films
American television films
Films directed by Philip Leacock
Films scored by Frank De Vol